The 1983 Copa del Rey Final was the 81st final of the Copa del Rey. The final was played at La Romareda in Zaragoza, on 4 June 1983, being won by Barcelona, who beat Real Madrid 2–1.

Match details 

|valign="top" width="50%"|

|}

See also
El Clásico

References

1983
Copa
FC Barcelona matches
Real Madrid CF matches
May 1983 sports events in Europe
El Clásico matches